The 2001 World Men's Handball Championship took place in France from 23 January to 4 February 2001. It was the 17th edition of the World Championship in team handball and the hosts won the championship.

Qualification

First round
The first four teams of each group qualify for the round of 16.

Group A

Group B

Group C

Group D

Knockout stage

Bracket
Championship bracket

5th place bracket

Round of 16

Places 9th to 16th
For places 9–16 the criteria was the number of points gained against the teams ranked first to fourth in the preliminary round in their group.

Quarterfinals

5–8th place semifinals

Semifinals

Seventh place game

Fifth place game

Third place game

Final

Final standings

Awards

Statistics

Top goalscorers

Top goalkeepers

Medalists

References

External links
XVII Men's World Championship at IHF.info

World Handball Championship tournaments
World Men's
World Men's Handball Championship
World Men's Handball Championship, 2001
World Men's Handball Championship
World Men's Handball Championship